Nepal Olympic Committee (IOC code: NEP) is the National Olympic Committee representing Nepal and their sports teams.

See also
Nepal Olympic Museum
National Games of Nepal

External links
Nepal Olympic Committee

Nepal
Oly
1962 establishments in Nepal

Sports organizations established in 1962